The 1993 Big Sky Conference men's basketball tournament was the eighteenth edition, held  at the Kibbie Dome at the University of Idaho in Moscow, Idaho.

Boise State defeated regular season champion and host Idaho in the final,  to clinch their third  tournament title  The game was televised on ESPN, with a tipoff after  

Fourth-seed  was attempting to win a third straight title, but was upset in the  It was the first Big Sky tournament in Moscow in

Format
Conference membership returned to eight this season; after thirteen years in the Big Sky, Nevada departed for the Big West the previous summer.

The tournament format was unchanged; the top six teams from the regular season were included and the regular season champion earned the right  The top two earned byes into the semifinals while the remaining four played in the quarterfinals; the top seed (host) met the lowest remaining seed in

Bracket

NCAA tournament
The Broncos (21–7) received an automatic bid to the NCAA tournament; no other Big Sky members were invited to the tournament or  Boise State was seeded fourteenth in the West regional and lost by twenty points in the first round to Vanderbilt in  This was the eleventh consecutive year in which the Big Sky representative lost in the first round.

See also
Big Sky Conference women's basketball tournament

References

Big Sky Conference men's basketball tournament
Tournament
Big Sky Conference men's basketball tournament
Big Sky Conference men's basketball tournament
Basketball competitions in Idaho
Sports in Moscow, Idaho
College sports tournaments in Idaho